Bukit Selambau is a state constituency in Kedah, Malaysia, that has been represented in the Kedah State Legislative Assembly since 1986.

The state constituency was created in the 1984 redistribution and is mandated to return a single member to the Kedah State Legislative Assembly under the first past the post voting system. This constituency has recorded 15 candidates to contest by-election in 2009, the most candidates ever in Malaysia election history.

Demographics

History

Polling districts 
According to the gazette issued on 30 March 2018, the Bukit Selambau constituency has a total of 21 polling districts.

Representation history

Election results

References 

Kedah state constituencies